The Strange Night of Helga Wangen (German: Die seltsame Nacht der Helga Wangen) is a 1928 German silent drama film directed by Holger-Madsen and starring Lee Parry and Francis Lederer. It was shot at the National Studios in Berlin. The film's sets were designed by the art director Otto Moldenhauer.

Cast
In alphabetical order
 Gerhard Dammann as Gendarm  
 Gertrud de Lalsky as Mutter  
 Otti Dietze as Mamsell Berg  
 Karl Falkenberg as Der rote Heinrich  
 Paul Henckels as Rentier Hilsoe  
 Francis Lederer as Werner Hilsoe  
 Georg Paeschke as Arrestaufseher Andersen  
 Lee Parry 
 Gustav Rickelt as Dr. Sylt  
 Eva Speyer as Selma Syndal  
 Hugo Werner-Kahle as Knud Hjarner  
 Bruno Ziener as Kaspar

References

External links

1928 films
Films of the Weimar Republic
Films directed by Holger-Madsen
German silent feature films
National Film films
German black-and-white films
1928 drama films
German drama films